Amorphus coralli  is a Gram-negative, halotolerant, heterotrophic and non-motile bacteria from the genus Amorphus which has been isolated from the Fungia granulosa from the Red Sea in Israel.

References

External links
Type strain of Amorphus coralli at BacDive -  the Bacterial Diversity Metadatabase	

Hyphomicrobiales
Bacteria described in 2008
Halophiles